Langres is a French cheese from the plateau of Langres in the region of Champagne-Ardenne. It has benefited from an Appellation d'origine contrôlée (AOC) since 1991.

Langres is a cow's milk cheese, cylindrical in shape, weighing about 180 g. The central pâte is soft, creamy in colour, and slightly crumbly, and is surrounded by a white Penicillium candidum rind. It is a less pungent cheese than Époisses, its local competition. It is best eaten between May and August after 5 weeks of aging, but it is also excellent March through December.

Production in 1998 was around 305 tons, a decline of 1.61% since 1996, and 2% on farms.

See also
 List of cheeses

References 

French products with protected designation of origin
French cheeses
Cow's-milk cheeses
Washed-rind cheeses